Orna Lin is the owner of the private firm Orna Lin & Co. and one of the leading labor lawyers in Israel. She is a graduate of the Hebrew University and has been a member of the Israeli Bar since 1981. She is currently the chairperson of the Israel Bar Association Council, and is the first woman ever elected to this position. She lectures in Labor Law at Tel Aviv University.

She was previously a partner at M. Seligman & Co., one of the largest law firms in Israel. Between 1999 and 2003 Orna was the head of the Tel Aviv Bar Association, being again the first woman ever elected to this position.

She is the daughter of former Israeli Knesset member Amnon Lin and granddaughter of Haifa's first Jewish mayor, Abba Hushi.

References

External links
Orna Lin & Co.
Orna Lin

Israeli jurists
Academic staff of Tel Aviv University
Living people
Hebrew University of Jerusalem alumni
1956 births